Sébastien Schemmel (born 2 June 1975) is a French former professional footballer who played as a defender.

Career
Schemmel was born in Nancy. He played for AS Nancy and Metz before being signed by manager Harry Redknapp for West Ham United. Metz president Carlo Molinari had complained about Schemmel's character, saying he was "phenomenally unstable." Schemmel was dropped from the Metz team and fined after an incident in December 2000 when he insulted two journalists, who later lodged a formal complaint with police.

In his first season in the Premier League, 2001–02, he won the "Hammer of the Year" award. Whilst at West Ham he played in their 1–0 victory over Manchester United at Old Trafford in the 2000–01 FA Cup, and scored once in the league against Derby County. The following season saw a downturn in form, perhaps caused by family problems. He left West Ham for Portsmouth in 2003. He scored once during his spell with Portsmouth, in a 2–1 win over Blackpool in the FA Cup.

After being released by Portsmouth in December 2004, he joined Le Havre AC for the rest of the season and played eight games.

References

External links

Football Memories

Living people
1975 births
Sportspeople from Nancy, France
Association football defenders
French footballers
West Ham United F.C. players
Portsmouth F.C. players
AS Nancy Lorraine players
FC Metz players
Le Havre AC players
Premier League players
Ligue 1 players
Expatriate footballers in England
French expatriate footballers
Footballers from Grand Est
French expatriate sportspeople in England